Detlef Kirchhoff (born 21 May 1967 in Halberstadt) is a German rower, who competed for the SG Dynamo Potsdam / Sportvereinigung (SV) Dynamo. He won the medals at the international rowing competitions. He competed at four Olympic Games, winning medals at three of them.

References

External links 
 
 
 
  
 Interview (ndr.de) 

1967 births
Living people
People from Halberstadt
People from Bezirk Magdeburg
East German male rowers
German male rowers
Sportspeople from Saxony-Anhalt
Olympic medalists in rowing
Medalists at the 1996 Summer Olympics
Medalists at the 1992 Summer Olympics
Medalists at the 1988 Summer Olympics
Olympic silver medalists for East Germany
Olympic bronze medalists for Germany
Olympic silver medalists for Germany
World Rowing Championships medalists for East Germany
World Rowing Championships medalists for Germany
Recipients of the Patriotic Order of Merit in silver
Recipients of the Silver Laurel Leaf
Olympic rowers of Germany
Olympic rowers of East Germany
Rowers at the 1988 Summer Olympics
Rowers at the 1992 Summer Olympics
Rowers at the 1996 Summer Olympics
Rowers at the 2000 Summer Olympics